Jalen McMillan (born December 7, 2001) is an American football wide receiver for the Washington Huskies.

High school career 
McMillan attended San Joaquin Memorial High School in Fresno, California. As a junior and senior, McMillan combined for 3,045 yards, 31 touchdowns, and 162 receptions. He also played baseball receiving offers from Oklahoma and USC to be a dual-sport athlete. McMillan was rated as a 4-star recruit and he committed to play college football at the University of Washington over offers from schools such as Notre Dame and Alabama.

College career 
As a freshman in 2020, McMillan played sparingly recording one catch for 16 yards. In his sophomore season, McMillan's production would increase, as he led the team in receiving yards with 470 while hauling in three touchdowns and 39 catches. Entering the 2022 season, McMillan was named a preseason All-PAC-12 honorable mention and is considered one of the top wide receiver prospects in the upcoming 2023 NFL Draft. In the first game of the season, McMillan caught two touchdown passes in a 41-20 victory.

References

External links 

 Washington Huskies bio

Living people
Washington Huskies football players
Players of American football from California
American football wide receivers
2001 births